Róbert Sass (born 27 October 1959) is a Hungarian rower. He competed in the men's eight event at the 1980 Summer Olympics.

References

1959 births
Living people
Hungarian male rowers
Olympic rowers of Hungary
Rowers at the 1980 Summer Olympics
Rowers from Budapest